The Russian Cup 2008–09 was the seventeenth season of the Russian football knockout tournament since the dissolution of Soviet Union. The competition started on April 16, 2008 and finished with the Final held in spring 2009. The defending champions were CSKA Moscow.

Preliminary round
This round featured 20 Second Division teams and 2 amateur teams. The games were played from April 16 – 27, 2008.

Section West

Section Center

Section South

Section Ural-Povolzhye

Note: Roman numerals in brackets denote the league tier the clubs participate in during the 2008 season.

First round
In this round entered 11 winners from the previous round as well as 57 other Second Division teams, what made every team competing in this round Second Division one. The matches were played from April 29 – May 18, 2008.

Section West

Section Center

Section South

Section Ural-Povolzhye

Section East

Second round
In this round entered 34 winners from the First Round and the 6 remaining Second Division teams. The matches were played from May 21 – 29, 2008.

Section West

Section Center

Section South

Section Ural-Povolzhye

Section East

Third round
The winners from the previous round entered this round. The matches were played from June 7 – 13, 2008.

Section West

Section Center

Section South

Section Ural-Povolzhye

Section East

Fourth round
In this round entered winners from the previous round as well as 22 First Division teams. The matches were played on June 30 and July 1, 2008.

|}
Note: Roman numerals in brackets denote the league tier the clubs participated in during the 2008 season.

Fifth round
All 16 Premier League teams entered the competition in this round together with 16 winners from the previous round. The matches were played on August 5 and 6, 2008.

|}
Note: Roman numerals in brackets denote the league tier the clubs participated in during the 2008 season.

Sixth Round
The winners from the previous round entered the Sixth Round. The matches were played on September 23 and 24, 2008.

Note: Roman numerals in brackets denote the league tier the clubs participated in during the 2008 season.

Quarter-finals
The matches were played on April 15 and 22, 2009.

Note: Roman numerals in brackets denote the league tier the clubs participated in during the 2009 season.

Semi-finals
The matches were played on May 6 and 13, 2009.

Final
The final was played on May 31, 2009.

Played in the earlier stages, but were not on the final game squad:

FC Rubin Kazan:  Gabriel (DF),  Jefthon (DF),  Vitali Kaleshin (DF),  Dato Kvirkvelia (DF), Igor Klimov (DF), Mikhail Mischenko (DF), Aleksei Popov (DF),  Lasha Salukvadze (DF),  Andrei Fyodorov (DF),  Vadim Afonin (MF),  Vagiz Galiullin (MF), Andrei Gorbanets (MF), Andrei Kobenko (MF), Aleksei Kotlyarov (MF), Sergei Semak (MF), Ildar Bikchantayev (FW),  Savo Milošević (FW),  Davron Mirzayev (FW), Ruslan Nagayev (FW), Igor Portnyagin (FW).

PFC CSKA Moscow: Anton Grigoryev (DF),  Luboš Kalouda (MF),  Elvir Rahimić (MF),  Ricardo Jesus (FW), Dmitri Ryzhov (FW),  Dawid Janczyk (FW).

External links
 Official page 
 Russian Cup on rsssf.com

Russian Cup seasons
Cup, 2008-09
Cup, 2008-09
Russian Cup, 2008-09